Theagenis Dionysatos (born 17 December 1975) is a Greek football defensive midfielder who has appeared in over 100 matches in Gamma Ethniki.

Career
Born in Mytilene, Dionysatos has spent most of his career with local side Aiolikos F.C., playing in over 100 matches in the third-tier of Greek football. In December 2008, the 33-year-old joined Kalloni F.C. from Aiolikos. He had played for Aiolikos in the Gamma Ethniki during the 1995–96, 1997–98 and 2007–08 seasons.

He has since returned to Aiolikos and was voted captain of the Delta Ethniki side in 2011.

References

1975 births
Living people
Greek footballers
Association football midfielders
Aiolikos F.C. players
People from Mytilene
Sportspeople from the North Aegean